Minersville is a town in southeastern Beaver County, Utah, United States. The population was 807 at the 2020 census, down from the 2010 figure of 907.

History
Minersville was settled in 1859 at the direction of Brigham Young so a lead mine could be operated on the site where Jesse N. Smith and three others had found lead the previous year.

Minersville had 446 residents in 1870, 525 in 1900 and in 1930 had 815 residents.

Geography
Minersville is located in south-central Beaver County in mountain foothills northwest of the Black Mountains, southwest of the Mineral Mountains, and at the northeast perimeter of the Escalante Desert.

Utah State Route 21 runs through the northern side of the town, leading north  to Milford and east  to Beaver. Utah State Route 130 leads south from Minersville,  to Cedar City.

Climate
The climate in this area has mild differences between highs and lows, and there is adequate rainfall year-round.  According to the Köppen Climate Classification system, Minersville has a marine west coast climate, abbreviated "Cfb" on climate maps.

Demographics
As of the census of 2000, there were 817 people, 256 households, and 204 families residing in the town. The population density was 1,289.3 people per square mile (500.7/km2). There were 274 housing units at an average density of 432.4 per square mile (167.9/km2). The racial makeup of the town was 93.76% White, 0.12% Asian, 0.12% Pacific Islander, 4.16% from other races, and 1.84% from two or more races. Hispanic or Latino of any race were 6.00% of the population.

There were 256 households, out of which 49.2% had children under the age of 18 living with them, 73.0% were married couples living together, 5.1% had a female householder with no husband present, and 20.3% were non-families. 18.0% of all households were made up of individuals, and 11.7% had someone living alone who was 65 years of age or older. The average household size was 3.19 and the average family size was 3.68.

In the town, the age distribution of the population shows 39.0% under the age of 18, 10.2% from 18 to 24, 23.6% from 25 to 44, 14.4% from 45 to 64, and 12.7% who were 65 years of age or older. The median age was 26 years. For every 100 females, there were 109.5 males. For every 100 females age 18 and over, there were 100.8 males.

The median income for a household in the town was $36,563, and the median income for a family was $39,286. Males had a median income of $31,042 versus $15,179 for females. The per capita income for the town was $11,693. About 7.3% of families and 9.0% of the population were below the poverty line, including 11.3% of those under age 18 and 3.4% of those age 65 or over.

See also

 List of cities and towns in Utah

References

External links

 

Populated places established in 1859
Towns in Beaver County, Utah
Towns in Utah
1859 establishments in Utah Territory